Geraldine Barniville (nee Houlihan; born 7 November 1942) is an Irish former squash and tennis player.

Barniville is a native of Birr in County Offaly and comes from a prominent legal family (of the D.A. Houlihan law firm).

As a tennis player, Barniville won a record nine Carrickmines titles during her career, the first in 1963. At the 1964 U.S. National Championships she faced the eighth-seeded Carole Caldwell in the second round and pushed her to deep in the third set. She played in 10 Federation Cup ties for Ireland between 1964 and 1977.

Despite not picking up squash until the age of 24, Barniville ended up competing at the World Championships. She competed three times with the Irish national team at the World Teams Championships and from 1978 to 1983 she was part of the team that was six times in a row runner-up in the European Teams Championships.

Barniville was married to the late tennis player Harry Barniville and their son David is a High Court judge.

References

External links
 
 
 

1942 births
Living people
Irish female tennis players
Sportspeople from County Offaly
People from Birr, County Offaly
Irish female squash players